Reuel Williams (June 2, 1783July 25, 1862) was an American lawyer and politician who served one term as a U.S. Senator from Maine from 1837 to 1843.

Early life and career
Born in Hallowell, Maine to Seth Williams and Zilpha Ingraham, he attended Hallowell Academy, and went on to study law. He was admitted to the bar in 1804, commencing practice in Augusta, Maine.

Political career
He was a member of the Maine Legislature, in the two houses of the legislature, from 1812 to 1829 and again in 1832 and 1848. He was commissioner of public buildings in 1831. He served as a presidential elector on the Democratic ticket in 1836.

In 1837, he was elected as a Democrat to the United States Senate to fill the vacancy caused by the resignation of Ether Shepley and served from March 4, 1837, to February 15, 1843, when he resigned.

While in the Senate he served as chairman of the U.S. Senate Committee on Naval Affairs.

Private life
He was also the manager of the Kennebec & Portland Railroad for 12 years. He died in Augusta, aged 79, and was interred in his family's cemetery on the banks of the Kennebec River in Augusta.

His son, Joseph H. Williams, also a politician, was elected Governor of Maine. Daughter, Jane E. Williams, married Unitarian minister and author Sylvester Judd on August 31, 1841; they had three children. Daughter Helen A. Williams married John Taylor Gilman originally of Exeter, New Hampshire. After his death, she was remarried to Charles H. Bell of Exeter, New Hampshire.

He died in Augusta, aged 79, and was interred in his family's cemetery on the banks of the Kennebec River in Augusta.

References 

Poor, John A. Memoir of Hon. Reuel Williams, Prepared for the Maine Historical Society. Cambridge, Massachusetts: Priv. print. H.O. Houghton and Company, 1864. googlebooks Retrieved May 3, 2008

1783 births
1862 deaths
Politicians from Augusta, Maine
People from Hallowell, Maine
Democratic Party Maine state senators
Democratic Party members of the Maine House of Representatives
Democratic Party United States senators from Maine
Maine lawyers
19th-century American politicians
19th-century American lawyers